Jean-Claude Coucardon (12 August 1950 – 21 September 2019) was a French rower. He competed at the 1972 Summer Olympics and the 1976 Summer Olympics.

References

1950 births
2019 deaths
French male rowers
Olympic rowers of France
Rowers at the 1972 Summer Olympics
Rowers at the 1976 Summer Olympics
Place of birth missing